Gumbranch, alternatively spelled Gum Branch, is a city in Liberty County, Georgia, United States. It is a part of the Hinesville-Fort Stewart metropolitan statistical area. The population was 264 at the 2010 census.

History 
Gumbranch was incorporated on January 1, 1979. While officially incorporated as "Gumbranch", the alternative spelling "Gum Branch" is often used, such as with the nearby Gum Branch Park and Gum Branch Baptist Church.

Geography

Gumbranch is located in western Liberty County at  (31.838765, -81.684384). Georgia State Route 196 passes through the community, leading east  to Hinesville, the county seat, and northwest  to Glennville.

Demographics

As of the 2010 United States Census, there were 264 people living in the city. The racial makeup of the city was 91.7% White, 4.5% Black, 0.8% Native American, 0.4% Pacific Islander and 0.8% from two or more races. 1.9% were Hispanic or Latino of any race.

As of the census of 2000, there were 273 people, 100 households, and 76 families living in the city. The racial makeup of the city was 91.58% White, 5.86% African American, 2.20% Asian, 0.37% from other races. Hispanic or Latino of any race were 1.10% of the population.

There were 100 households, out of which 34.0% had children under the age of 18 living with them, 60.0% were married couples living together, 9.0% had a female householder with no husband present, and 24.0% were non-families. 22.0% of all households were made up of individuals, and 7.0% had someone living alone who was 65 years of age or older.  The average household size was 2.73 and the average family size was 3.17.

In the city, the population was spread out, with 28.9% under the age of 18, 11.7% from 18 to 24, 28.9% from 25 to 44, 24.5% from 45 to 64, and 5.9% who were 65 years of age or older.  The median age was 30 years. For every 100 females, there were 105.3 males.  For every 100 females age 18 and over, there were 98.0 males.

The median income for a household in the city was $35,625, and the median income for a family was $40,938. Males had a median income of $30,625 versus $17,917 for females. The per capita income for the city was $13,158.  About 19.7% of families and 24.6% of the population were below the poverty line, including 28.6% of those under the age of eighteen and 46.2% of those 65 or over.

Government and infrastructure

Liberty County Fire Services operates Station 15 Gumbranch.

Education
The Liberty County School District operates public schools that serve Gumbranch.

References

External links

 Gumbranch - State of Georgia

Cities in Georgia (U.S. state)
Cities in Liberty County, Georgia
Hinesville metropolitan area
Populated places established in 1979